Keith McMillan (13 February 1927 – 23 May 1998) was a Scotland international rugby union footballer. McMillan played as a Flanker.

Rugby union career

Amateur career

He played rugby for the University of Cape Town while in South Africa.

McMillan played for Sale.

Provincial career

McMillan represented Eastern Province and Western Province in South Africa.

International career

He was involved in a trial selection match for South Africa in 1951 but not selected further.

He was capped for  4 times in 1953.

Outside of rugby

McMillan was an engineer.

A keen cricketer, he played for the combined South African Universities team.

References

1927 births
1998 deaths
Scottish rugby union players
Scotland international rugby union players
Rugby union players from Durban
Rugby union flankers
Alumni of Hilton College (South Africa)
Eastern Province Elephants players
Western Province (rugby union) players